is a 1956 West German film directed by Karl Anton.

Plot summary 
The title refers to the leading character, the post mistress Christel, in Carl Zeller's 1891 operetta .

Cast 
Gardy Granass as Christel Werner, post mistress
Hardy Krüger as Horst Arndt, assistant police detective
Claus Biederstaedt as Mecky Doppler
Paul Hörbiger as Ferdinand Brenneis, hotel owner
Hannelore Bollmann as Rita Hohenfeld
Gunther Philipp as Poldi Blaha
Carla Hagen as Ruth Bornemann, post mistress
Lotte Rausch as Ella Lenz, inn keeper
Ludwig Manfred Lommel as Prof. Hummel, botanist
Karl Hellmer as Pelzer, hotel porter
Stanislav Ledinek as Antonio, owner of a beer garden
Hilde von Stolz as Anni Klewinski
Oscar Sabo as Klabuschke
 as Klewinski, general direktor
Hans Schwarz Jr. as Franz, valet

 as Otto
Carl Wery as Egon Hanke, police detective
 as themselves

Soundtrack 
"" (Music by Werner Müller, lyrics by )
"" (Music by Werner Müller, lyrics by Hans Bradtke)
"" (Music by Werner Müller, lyrics by Hans Bradtke)

See also
 The Bird Seller (1935)
 Roses in Tyrol (1940)
 The Bird Seller (1953)
 The Bird Seller (1962)

References

External links 

, Claus Biederstaedt, Gardy Granass

1956 films
West German films
1956 romantic comedy films
German romantic comedy films
1950s German-language films
Constantin Film films
1950s German films